Dealu Bisericii may refer to several villages in Romania:

 Dealu Bisericii, a village in Uda, Argeș
 Dealu Bisericii, a village in Sinești, Vâlcea